National Pei Men Senior High School is a senior high school located in Jiali District, Tainan, Taiwan.

History 
 March 29, 1946: Founded as Tainan County Pei Men Junior High School
 August 1, 1947: Added senior high department and renamed to Tainan County Pei Men High School
 August 1, 1952: Promoted as Taiwan Provincial Pei Men High School
 August 1, 1968: Stopped to enroll junior-high students
 August 1, 1970: Renamed to Taiwan Provincial Pei Men Senior High School
 February 1, 2000: Renamed to National Pei Men Senior High School

Football team 

Founded in August 1981, National Pei Men Senior High School football team was one of the most strongest senior high school football teams in Taiwan. The first squad consisted of players from local Jia Li Junior High School and San Min Junior High School of Kaohsiung County (now part of Kaohsiung City). Numerous talented Taiwanese football youngsters who later played important roles in the Chinese Taipei national team and domestic first-division teams were brought up here, and they gained victories in many domestic and international competitions.

In this period, Pei Men welcomed gifted players from all corners of the nation. However, local youth training system was not established as well, and Pei Men soon encountered the crisis of lacking new players after   other townships started to build up their own football teams. In 1992, Pei Men failed to win their 6th consecutive champion title in Taiwan High School Games, and, unfortunately, the team was then dissolved.

After nearly 10 years of silence, the school administrative staff reorganized the team in 2000 and enrolled new generation of local young footballers in 2001. Hung Chin-chang and Chen Jiunn-ming, both Pei Men alumni and notable Taiwanese football players, were engaged to join the coaching staff. In the first season of Highschool Football League in 2006, Pei Men won the champion and embraced all individual league awards (best coach, best player, and golden shoe).

Current squad

Cradle of Goalkeepers
National Pei Men Senior High School [football team] is nicknamed "Cradle of Goalkeepers" for bringing up good goalkeepers. Lu Kun-chi and Chung Kuang-tien, current goalkeepers in the national team squad, are past and current Pei Men players respectively.

Honors

1981-1991
 Taiwan High School Games
 Winners (7): 1983, 1985, 1987, 1988, 1989, 1990, 1991
 Runners-up (2): 1982, 1986
 Chiang Kai-shek Cup
 Winners (6): 1982, 1983, 1987, 1988, 1989, 1990
 Runners-up (4): 1981, 1985, 1986, 1991
 Lee Wai Tong Cup
 Winners (8): 1982, 1983, 1984, 1985, 1988, 1989, 1990, 1991
 Runners-up (1): 1987

2001-present
 Highschool Football League
 Winners (3): 2006, 2007, 2008
 National Youth Cup
 Winner (1): 2007
 Runners-up (3): 2002, 2005, 2006
 National High School Games
 Winner (1): 2003
 Runner-up (1): 2004

See also
 Education in Taiwan

References

External links 
National Pei Men Senior High School 
 National Pei Men Senior High School football team , maintained by coach Hung Chin-chang
 National Pei Men Senior High School football team's forum 

1946 establishments in Taiwan
Educational institutions established in 1946
High schools in Taiwan
Schools in Tainan
Taiwanese youth football teams